Acrotome inflata is a species of flowering plant in the family Lamiaceae. This species is native to Africa. Acrotome inflata was first published in 1848 by George Bentham.'

Charcteristics 
Acrotome inflata is an erect annual herb that grows up to 1 metre tall. Its stems are densely covered in appressed hairs. The arragement of its leaves are opposite and are either sessile or shorty petiolate. The leaves range from being ovate, to being oblong-lanceolate and usually grow from 3-12 cm long (but are mostly wider on the lower part of the stem). Its leaves very hairy on both sides and its margins are rarely crenate-dentate. Its flowers are grouped in dense rows in inflorescendes that come in verticils, it has many bracteoles, are filiforms that grow up to 1 centimetre long, are densely-hairy and are spine-tipped.' Its corolla come in colors varing from white to pale mauve.

Habitat 
Acrotome inflata usually thrives in dry tropical biomes, usually depending on the season.

References

Taxa named by George Bentham
Plants described in 1848
Flora of Angola
Flora of Botswana
Flora of the Cape Provinces
Flora of the Free State
Flora of Lesotho
Flora of Namibia
Flora of the Northern Provinces
Flora of Zambia
Flora of Zimbabwe
Lamiaceae